Governor Bowie may refer to:

Oden Bowie (1826–1894), 34th Governor of Maryland
Robert Bowie (1750–1818), 11th Governor of Maryland